Craughwell GAA is a Gaelic Athletic Association club located in Craughwell, County Galway, Ireland. The club was founded in 1885 by Gavin Keenan and is exclusively concerned with the game of hurling.

Honours
 Galway Senior Hurling Championship (5): 1909, 1915, 1918, 1930, 1931,  Runners-Up 2015
 Galway Minor Hurling Championship: (3) 1968, 2001, 2002

Notable players
 Gerard O'Halloran
 Niall Healy
 Fergal Healy
Fiacra Bond
Cathal Duffy
Rian Comer

References

External links
Craughwell GAA site

Gaelic games clubs in County Galway
Hurling clubs in County Galway